A platinum jubilee is a celebration held to mark an anniversary. Among monarchies, it usually refers to a 70th anniversary. 

The most recent monarch to celebrate a platinum jubilee is Queen Elizabeth II of the United Kingdom and the other Commonwealth realms in June 2022. The celebrations were delayed from the actual February anniversary and the ceremony occurred on a four-day Bank Holiday on June 2, 2022, as was announced earlier. Elizabeth II died on September 8, 2022, shortly after the official celebrations in the Commonwealth took place.

A 75th anniversary can be referred to as a diamond jubilee occasionally, but that term is commonly used to refer to a 60th anniversary. An anniversary of 100 years is simply called a centenary.

See also 

 Wedding anniversary
 Hierarchy of precious substances
 List of longest-reigning monarchs

References

Anniversaries